{{Infobox concert
|artist        = Carrie Underwood
|concert_tour_name = Storyteller Tour: Stories in the Round
|image         = CUnderwood_2016TourPoster.jpg
|image_size    = 220px
|landscape     = yes
|caption       = Promotional poster for the tour
|album         = Storyteller
|location      = North AmericaEurope
|start_date    = 
|end_date      = 
|gross         = $56,804,491
|last_tour     = Blown Away Tour(2012–13)
|this_tour     = Storyteller Tour: Stories in the Round(2016)|
|next_tour     = Ripcord World Tour(2016)
|number_of_shows = 87 in North America5 in Europe92 Total
|number_of_legs  = 4
}}

The Storyteller Tour: Stories in the Round' was the fifth headlining concert tour from American country music artist Carrie Underwood. The tour is in support of her fifth studio album Storyteller (2015) and began on January 30, 2016, in Jacksonville, Florida. It concluded on November 28, 2016, after 92 shows. For the shows in the United States, $1 from each ticket sold will be donated to Underwood's C.A.T S. Foundation. This was her first tour in three years.
The tour sold over 1.2 million tickets during its run. By June, 2016, Billboard had named the number-one country tour of the first half of the year.

Underwood released a concert film, Carrie Underwood: The Storyteller Tour - Stories in the Round, on November 17, 2017.

Background
News of the tour was first mentioned in a Rolling Stone interview in September 2015. The tour was officially announced on October 27, 2015, via Underwood's Official Fan Club website. "Stories in the Round" comes from this being Underwood's first tour where the stage is 360 degrees and in the middle of the arena floor. Underwood shares her excitement for the tour stating; I can't wait to play new music from Storyteller for the fans. I am so blessed to have this career and get to do the things I do, but there is nothing like that moment when I get to step onto the stage to sing and all the fans are singing along with me. The second leg was announced on March 31, 2016.

Concert synopsis
Moments before the show starts AC/DC's "Back in Black" is played. Then the lighting structure above the stage descends to the floor of center stage where Underwood and her band emerge. She starts off with "Renegade Runaway" a new track off Storyteller'' followed by "Last Name" that contains bits of her duet with Miranda Lambert, "Somethin' Bad". The setlist consists of new and past favorites, and covers. For the encore she closes with "Smoke Break" and "Something in the Water".

Stage design and production
The 360 degree center stage of three circles is equipped with movable parts that allows Underwood and her band access to below the stage where they can change outfits or swap out instruments. The three tier lighting structure displays lyrics and colors and moves, rotates, and twists. In addition there are sparkles, fireworks, lasers, smoke and explosions, and a big light show. Underwood's goal was to harmonica for "Choctaw County Affair", which she reached. Drums were added during "Church Bells" in the fall leg.

Opening acts
Easton Corbin & The Swon Brothers 
Lauren Alaina, Jill Johnson & Pauper Kings 
Little Big Town, Sam Hunt & Maddie & Tae

Setlist
The following setlist is from the January 30 show in Jacksonville, Florida. It is not intended to represent all dates throughout the tour.

"Renegade Runaway"
"Last Name" / "Somethin' Bad"
"Undo It"
"Good Girl"
"Church Bells"
"Cowboy Casanova"
"Heartbeat"
"Jesus, Take the Wheel"
"Wasted"
"Blown Away"
"Two Black Cadillacs"
"Dirty Laundry"
"Choctaw County Affair"
"I Will Always Love You"
"What I Never Knew I Always Wanted"
"Fishin' in the Dark" 
"Clock Don't Stop"
"All-American Girl"
"Little Toy Guns"
"Before He Cheats"
Encore
"Smoke Break"
"Something in the Water"

Notes
From March 4 to 16, "What I Never Knew I Always Wanted", "All American Girl", and "Fishin' in the Dark" were temporarily cut from the set list. Additionally, "Flat on the Floor" and "Chaser" were temporarily added.
Starting on August 31, a cover of Alabama's "Mountain Music" replaced "Fishin' in the Dark".

Tour dates

List of festivals and other miscellaneous performances, rescheduling 
 These concerts were a part of C2C: Country to Country.
 This concert is a part of the ACM Party for a Cause Festival.
 The Houston concert was supposed to take place on April 19, but was rescheduled to April 25 due to severe weather.
 This concert is a part of the Stagecoach Festival.
 This concert is a part of the CMA Music Festival.
 This concert is a part of the Country Fest 30th Anniversary.
 This concert is a part of the Great Jones Country Fair.
 This concert is a part of the Oregon Jamboree.
 This concert is a part of the Sunfest Country Music Festival.
 This concert is a part of the Big Valley Jamboree.

Reception
In November 2016, Billboard reported the tour to have earned around $54.6 million with 800,000 tickets sold, with four more shows that had not been added to that total. This marked The Storyteller Tour as Underwood's highest-grossing tour to date. According to a document from The Smoking Gun, Underwood was contracted to earn $500,000 per show.

Scott Mervis of the Pittsburgh Post-Gazette says, "As she's not much of a talker, this was not a "Storyteller" tour in the sense of narrating the show with stories. She let the music and character-driven lyrics do most of the talking, at max volume." Tampa Bay Times'''s Jay Cridlin said that Underwood packed "nearly two dozen hits into an overpowering set that felt a whole more like arena rock than a country bar." Also, "Underwood alone remains the one with the voice and ambition to go full pop star, unleashing the full force of her roaring band and singing like a woman ready to take the wheel back from Jesus."

Serene Dominic of The Arizona Republic gave a negative review of the show, criticizing the big-production take on Underwood's songs, writing, "You couldn’t call a show with Super Bowl halftime show production values "intimate." Maybe the anecdotes wouldn't have been that revealing from an artist like Underwood, who rarely writes a song without two other people in the parenthesis with her (not a knock, but the talk would've probably been more industry insider than the average audience would want to hear)." Jay Lustig gave a similarly negative review, criticizing Underwood waving at fans during the darker songs, writing, "Proving, perhaps, that you can take the singer out of American Idol but you can’t take the American Idol'' out of the singer, she used, throughout the show, a bit of showbiz shtick that she really should lose: A cheerful wave to an audience member in the middle of a verse or chorus. She did this even on songs that were about heartbreak, or cheating men. I know it was just a little thing, but I found it jarring, nearly every time she did it."

References

External links
Carrie Underwood Official Website

2016 concert tours
Carrie Underwood concert tours